The 1971 Preakness Stakes was the 96th running of the $200,000 Preakness Stakes thoroughbred horse race. The race took place on May 15, 1971, and was televised in the United States on the CBS television network. Canonero II, who was jockeyed by Gustavo Ávila, won the race by one and one half lengths over runner-up Eastern Fleet. Approximate post time was 5:40 p.m. Eastern Time. The race was run on a fast track in a final time of 1:54 flat. The Maryland Jockey Club reported total attendance of 47,221, this is recorded as third highest on the list of American thoroughbred racing top attended events for North America in 1971.

Payout 

The 96th Preakness Stakes Payout Schedule

The full chart 

 Winning Breeder: E. B. Benjamin; (KY)
 Winning Time: 1:54 3/5
 Track Condition: Fast
 Total Attendance: 47,221

References

External links 
 

1971
1971 in horse racing
Horse races in Maryland
1971 in American sports
1971 in sports in Maryland